Blood and Sand is a 1922 American silent drama film produced by Paramount Pictures, directed by Fred Niblo and starring Rudolph Valentino, Lila Lee, and Nita Naldi. It was based on the 1909 Spanish novel Sangre y arena (Blood and Sand) by Vicente Blasco Ibáñez and the play version of the book by Thomas Cushing.

Plot
Juan Gallardo (Valentino), a village boy born into poverty, grows up to become one of the greatest matadors in Spain. He marries a friend from his childhood, the beautiful and virtuous Carmen (Lee), but after he achieves fame and fortune he finds himself drawn to Doña Sol (Naldi), a wealthy, seductive widow.

They embark on a torrid affair with sadomasochistic overtones, but Juan, feeling guilty over his betrayal of Carmen, tries to free himself of Doña Sol. Furious at being rejected, she exposes their affair to Carmen and Juan's mother, seemingly destroying his marriage. Growing more and more miserable and dissipated, Juan becomes reckless in the arena. He is eventually killed in a bullfight but does manage to reconcile with Carmen moments before he dies.

There is also a subplot involving a local outlaw whose career is paralleled to Juan's throughout the film by the village philosopher: Juan's fatal injury in the bullring comes moments after the outlaw is shot by the police.

Cast
 Rosa Rosanova – Angustias
 Leo White – Antonio
 Rosita Marstini – Encarnacion
 Rudolph Valentino – Juan Gallardo (billed Rodolph Valentino)
 Lila Lee – Carmen
 Charles Belcher – Don Joselito
 Fred Becker – Don Jose
 George Field – El Nacional
 Jack Winn – Potaje
 Harry Lamont – Puntillero
 Gilbert Clayton – Garabato
 Walter Long – Plumitas
 Nita Naldi – Doña Sol
 George Periolat – Marquis of Guevera
 Sidney De Gray – Dr. Ruiz
Dorcas Matthews

Production notes
The film was produced by Famous Players-Lasky Corporation and Paramount Pictures, and distributed by Paramount. June Mathis, who has been credited as discovering Valentino, adapted the novel for the screen.

Dorothy Arzner worked as the film's editor. Arzner, who would later become one of the first female film directors, used stock footage of bullfights filmed in Madrid interspersed with close-ups of Valentino. Her work on the film helped to solidify her reputation of being a resourceful editor as her techniques also saved Paramount money. She would later say that working on the film was the "first waymark to my claim to a little recognition as an individual."

Reception

Blood and Sand premiered at the Rialto Theater in Los Angeles on August 22, 1922. The film was a box office hit and was one of the top-grossing films of 1922. The film, along with The Sheik and Four Horsemen of the Apocalypse (both 1921), helped to establish Valentino as a star and was one of the most successful films of his career. "In my judgement it is the best thing he has done," said Mary Pickford of Valentino's performance, "and one of Mr. Niblo's finest pictures. It is one of the few pictures I have been able to sit through twice and enjoy the second time more than the first."

Other adaptations
An earlier version of Blood and Sand was released in 1916, and filmed by Blasco Ibáñez himself, with the help of Max André. This earlier version was restored in 1998 by the Filmoteca de la Generalitat Valenciana (Spain).
 
Blood and Sand has also been remade twice; a 1941 version was directed by Rouben Mamoulian and stars Tyrone Power, Linda Darnell, and Rita Hayworth. The 1989 Spanish remake was directed by Javier Elorrieta and stars Chris Rydell, Sharon Stone, and Ana Torrent.

In popular culture
The film was the source of legendary football player Johnny "Blood" McNally's nickname - he started playing professional under an alias to protect his remaining college eligibility.  He and a friend passed a theater where Blood and Sand was playing. Suddenly, McNally exclaimed to his friend, "That's it! You be Sand. I'll be Blood".

Blood and Sand was parodied by Stan Laurel in Mud and Sand (1922). In the film, Laurel portrays a character named Rhubarb Vaselino. Will Rogers also parodied Blood and Sand in the Hal Roach short film Big Moments From Little Pictures (1924).

The film gave its name to a popular Prohibition-era cocktail, the Blood and Sand.

References

External links

Blood and Sand at SilentEra
 (abridged:26 minutes)
Blood and Sand available for free download at Internet Archive (full)

1922 romantic drama films
1922 films
American romantic drama films
American silent feature films
American black-and-white films
Bullfighting films
Famous Players-Lasky films
Films based on Spanish novels
Films based on works by Vicente Blasco Ibáñez
Films directed by Fred Niblo
Films set in Spain
Paramount Pictures films
Articles containing video clips
Surviving American silent films
1920s English-language films
1920s American films
Silent romantic drama films
Silent American drama films